Skyservice Airlines Inc. was a charter airline (Skyservice Airlines) based in Etobicoke, Toronto, Ontario, Canada. It employed more than 2,000 people. Skyservice Airlines Inc. flew within Canada and to the United States, Caribbean, Mexico, Venezuela, Israel and Europe. During the summer, Skyservice sold tickets to Europe from Toronto using a Boeing 757-200WL. It also used an Airbus A330-300 for other chartered flights to Europe from Canada. Scheduled services to some destinations were offered during the summer season. Skyservice offered online-booking for those who wished to travel on Skyservice's scheduled destinations in the summer. Skyservice Airlines began operations in 1994.

Skyservice was forced into receivership on March 31, 2010, as a result of a near $9 million debt to its long-term partner Sunquest Vacations. As a result, Skyservice abruptly ceased operations. Roughly 860 jobs were expected to be lost as a result.

History

The airline was started in 1986. On May 2, 2005, Skyservice introduced the first of two Boeing 767-300 aircraft to its fleet, the first of which entered service on that date with a flight from Toronto to Puerto Vallarta. The aircraft (both formerly with MyTravel Airways) operated summer charters from Toronto to the United Kingdom and Europe for Sunquest Vacations, and in the winter flew from Vancouver to the Caribbean and Mexico. It was one of the few discount airlines operating in Canada which still offered full meal service.

On August 28, 2007, it was announced that Skyservice sold a majority interest in its airlines business to Vancouver-based private equity company Gibralt Capital Corp. No changes in senior management, operations or staffing levels were planned.

In March 2009, Skyservice partnered with Inflite Media to offer tray table advertising across its fleet of aircraft, the first such advertising network available in Canada.

Skyservice was forced into receivership on March 31, 2010, as a result of an $8.8 million debt to its long-term partner Sunquest Vacations. The last Skyservice flight, from Punta Cana to Winnipeg, took place on the same day.

The private charter portion of the airline continues to operate today under Skyservice Business Aviation with Fixed Base Operations in Toronto, Ottawa, Montreal and Calgary.

Fleet
The Skyservice fleet consisted of the following aircraft on 20 November 2009:

Historical fleet
2 Boeing 767-300
4 Airbus A319
1 Airbus A330-300

Classes
Economy Class
Star Class
Superior Class 
Premier Class

Awards and recognition
Skyservice was recognized for its exceptional safety record during its 25 years of operation, distinguishable by
the highest Platinum rating awarded to Skyservice by the Aviation Research Group/US - North
America's most rigid rating for operational safety.

Skyservice Business Aviation
While the airline ceased operations, the business aviation section remains in operation today in Toronto, Ottawa, Calgary and Montreal.

See also 
 List of defunct airlines of Canada

References

External links

Official website
Skyservice fleet
Skyservice Pilots' Association of Canada

Air Transport Association of Canada
Airlines established in 1986
Airlines disestablished in 2010
Companies based in Etobicoke
Defunct airlines of Canada
1986 establishments in Ontario
2010 disestablishments in Ontario